Archibald Alexander (1755 – September 12, 1822) was an American physician and politician from New Castle County, Delaware, near the city of New Castle. He was a veteran of the American Revolution and a member of the Democratic-Republican Party who served in the Delaware General Assembly.

Early life
Alexander was born in 1755 in Virginia into an Ulster-Scots family and moved to New Castle County, Delaware, when he was a small boy. He attended Newark Academy and studied medicine under Matthew Wilson. He was a member of the Presbyterian Church.

During the American Revolution, Alexander first served in the state militia but soon after joined the 10th Virginia Regiment of the Continental Army as a surgeon. After two years, he left the army to serve as a privateer out of Norfolk. Eventually his ship was captured and he was taken prisoner, serving out the remainder of the war in a prison ship in New York Harbor.

Career
After the war, Alexander returned to New Castle County and practiced medicine. He was also active in the Democratic-Republican Party and was its first candidate for Governor of Delaware in 1795. He was able to carry heavily Presbyterian New Castle County, but lost the remainder of the state and the election to Federalist Gunning Bedford, Sr. A wealthy man, he was a supporter of banks and a founder of the Farmers' Bank of Delaware. He also led the effort to have a controversial bridge built over the Christiana River in Christiana, Delaware.

Death
Alexander died on September 12, 1822, in New Castle County. He is buried at the Immanuel Episcopal Church cemetery.

Public offices

Election results

References

External links

History of Delaware 1609-1888 

1755 births
1822 deaths
American Presbyterians
American Revolutionary War prisoners of war held by Great Britain
Continental Army officers from Delaware
Delaware Democratic-Republicans
Members of the Delaware House of Representatives
Delaware state senators
People from New Castle County, Delaware